Spaghetti alla chitarra, also known as maccheroni alla chitarra, is a variety of egg pasta typical of the Abruzzo region in Italy, with a square cross section about 2–3 mm thick. Tonnarelli are a similar pasta from Lazio.  Ciriole is the thicker version of chitarra, approximately twice the thickness of spaghetti. Because the pasta are cut from a sheet rather than extruded through a die, spaghetti alla chitarra are square rather than round in cross-section.

Origin of the name
The name of this spaghetti comes from the tool (the so-called chitarra, literally "guitar") this pasta is produced with. This tool gives the spaghetti its name, shape, and a porous texture that allows pasta sauce to adhere well to the pasta itself. The chitarra is a frame with a series of parallel wires crossing it.

History and production 
The origin of the chitarra is still not very clear, though a traditional recipe from the province of Teramo originated in the early 1800s or even before. It is also claimed that the chitarra originated from the province of Chieti. Before then, pasta was cut with a special rolling pin with notches to obtain its particular shape. Although its origins are from Abruzzo, you can find different versions and names in the southern part of Italy. It gets the name of tonnarelli in Lazio, torchioli, troccoli, or truoccoli in Basilicata and Apulia, or cirioli Molisani in Molise.

The dough consists of durum wheat semolina and eggs, with no added salt. It is then worked and, after a rest of about 30 minutes covered, rolled flat with a rolling pin. The dough is then placed on the chitarra and pushed through with the rolling pin, so that the strings of the "guitar" cut it into strips. Pasta makers from Abruzzo bring down the cut dough by passing their fingers over it, as they would "play a guitar."

In Abruzzo, maccheroni alla chitarra are most typically prepared with a ragu of pork, beef, and lamb. In particular areas of the Abruzzi (for example Teramo) the traditional condiment is tomato sauce with beef meatballs, so-called pallottine. In Abruzzo, chitarra alla teramana, which is a traditional Abruzzo recipe, is a long thin squared spaghetti pasta served with tiny meatballs (polpettine). It is generally a first course meal (primo piatto).

A dried variation, without egg, is often marketed as spaghetti or maccheroni alla chitarra both within and outside Italy.

See also

 List of pasta
 Spaghetti with meatballs

References

Types of pasta
Spaghetti
Cuisine of Abruzzo